Tiempo De Remixes is a compilation of remixes by Cetu Javu released in 1994. It consists of 5 remixed tracks followed by the 5 tracks in their original form.

Track listing
All songs written by Cetu Javu.

CD: ModerMusic EP.1001M
 "A Dónde" (Remix) – 5:30
 "Una Mujer" (Remix) – 4:24
 "Dáme Tu Mano" (Remix) – 4:23
 "Por Que?" (Remix) – 5:02
 "Tiempo" (Remix) – 4:59
 "A Dónde" – 4:02
 "Una Mujer" – 4:38
 "Dáme Tu Mano" – 3:49
 "Por Que?" – 4:10
 "Tiempo" – 4:18

Personnel
 Recorded and Mixed at Hansa Tonstudios & Tritonus Studios
 Produced by Cetu Javu
 Mixed by Ivan Ten & Iñaki Marín (Tracks 1–5)
 Remix by Xasqui Ten (Tracks 1–5)
 Artwork by [Graphic Design] - Toni Rubio

References

1994 albums
Cetu Javu albums